Balne railway station served the village of Balne, North Yorkshire, England, from 1871 to 1964  on the East Coast Main Line.

History 
The station opened on 2 January 1871 by the North Eastern Railway. The station closed to passengers on 15 September 1958 and to goods traffic in 1964.

References

External links 
 

Disused railway stations in North Yorkshire
Former North Eastern Railway (UK) stations
Railway stations in Great Britain opened in 1871
Railway stations in Great Britain closed in 1958
1871 establishments in England
1964 disestablishments in England